Ivano Baldanzeddu (born 11 April 1986) is an Italian football defender.

External links
 gazzetta.it
 

1986 births
People from the Province of Sassari
Footballers from Sardinia
Living people
Italian footballers
Association football defenders
Empoli F.C. players
U.S. Massese 1919 players
U.S. Avellino 1912 players
A.C. Ancona players
A.S.D. Città di Foligno 1928 players
S.S.D. Lucchese 1905 players
S.S. Juve Stabia players
Spezia Calcio players
Virtus Entella players
Latina Calcio 1932 players
Venezia F.C. players
Catania S.S.D. players
Arzachena Academy Costa Smeralda players
Serie A players
Serie B players
Serie C players